The Union Confederate Monument, also known as the Unknown Confederate Gravesite Monument, is an outdoor Confederate memorial installed in Kansas City, Missouri's Union Cemetery, in the United States. The  granite obelisk monument was erected by the U.S. government in 1911 to commemorate the 15 Confederate prisoners of war buried at the site. The exact location of their individual graves is unknown. The memorial includes two bronze tablets displaying the names of the prisoners, who were captured during the Battle of Westport.

See also
 1911 in art
 List of Confederate monuments and memorials

References

1911 establishments in Missouri
1911 sculptures
Buildings and structures in Kansas City, Missouri
Confederate States of America monuments and memorials in Missouri
Granite sculptures in the United States
Obelisks in the United States
Outdoor sculptures in Missouri